Kevin Roentgen (pronounced "rent-gehn") is an American singer, songwriter, record producer and formerly guitarist for the rock band Orson, who is currently based in Nashville, Tennessee. Roentgen is previously known for fronting L.A. rock bands American Pearl (Wind-Up Records), SOUL (Elektra Records) and Goldsboro.

Following the break-up of American Pearl, Roentgen spent most of 2003 in the studio writing and demo-ing new songs. The result was Praying Hands, The Acoustic EP, recorded and co-produced by Noah Shain at White Buffalo Studio in Hollywood.

In 2005, Roentgen joined L.A. band Orson as a guitarist. In 2006, Orson released their debut, Bright Idea (Mercury Records), which contained the single, No Tomorrow. Orson went on to win the Brit Award in 2007 for Best International Breakthrough Act. In the Fall of 2007, Orson released the album Culture Vultures, containing the single Ain't No Party.

The full length Praying Hands album entitled Dogs and Airplanes was released in October 2008. The song "Lead the Way" from the Dogs and Airplanes album is featured in a film by director, Julie Davis, called Finding Bliss that stars Leelee Sobieski, Donnamarie Recco, Denise Richards and Jamie Kennedy.

In 2008, Roentgen co-produced with Noah Shain a project called Hott Mess, an album of 10 songs written and performed by Roentgen, Shain and singer Shayna Ross.

In 2009, Croire en l'homme, was released as the b-side to the debut title track single from Johnny Hallyday's latest album, Ca n'finira jamais. Written by Roentgen and Oliver Leiber, the single debuted at #1 on the French Single Charts, the week of November 14, 2008, and remained number one for two weeks. Later that year, Roentgen produced the Light of Day EP for LA band, Analog Smith.

In May 2012, Goldsboro, featuring Roentgen, Chris Cano and Johnny Lonely, released their debut album produced by Noah Shain. They were hand-picked by Guns N' Roses to open LA shows from their Up Close and Personal Tour at the Wiltern and House of Blues and also four shows at The Joint Hard Rock Hotel for Gn'R's 2012 and 2014 residencies. Goldsboro's song, Angels, was featured in Sons of Anarchy season 4, episode 11. Their song "Great White Buffalo" has had repeated airplay on Sex Pistols Steve Jones L.A. radio show, Jonesy's Jukebox on KROQ. Goldsboro has also played shows with Helmet and Dave Lombardo from Slayer's side band, Philm. In November 2012 and May 2013, Goldsboro toured the UK garnering them favorable reviews in UK publications Mojo Magazine, Classic Rock Magazine, Metal Hammer and Kerrang!, as well as airplay on XFM London and Radio 2.

In 2017, Roentgen began playing guitar with L.A.-based rock band Buckcherry. He left the band in July 2020.

Roentgen has also written and produced original music compositions for Fox TV promos including New Girl, Ben and Kate, Enlisted, The Following, ADHD, Glee, Hell's Kitchen, Allen Gregory, American Idol, Lone Star, Chicago Code, Fringe, Bones, Cops, Empire, The Exorcist, Rosewood, Gotham, Ghosted and The Orville.

References

External links
 https://orangeamps.com/artist/kevin-roentgen-of-buckcherry/
 http://goldsboroband.com
 http://audiophilemusic.co
 http://www.last.fm/music/Orson
 http://www.findingblissthemovie.com/
 http://www.analogsmithmusic.com/
 http://www.nouse.co.uk/2006/11/07/like-totally-orson-man/
 http://cdbaby.com/cd/prayinghands2
 http://www.nouse.co.uk/2006/11/07/like-totally-orson-man/
 https://www.youtube.com/watch?v=o3MWXRT7GU8

American rock musicians
Living people
Musicians from Los Angeles
Year of birth missing (living people)